La Corredora (foaled 1949) was an American Thoroughbred racemare voted the American Champion Handicap Mare of 1953 by the New York Turf Writers Association.

La Corredora, which in the Spanish language means "The Runner", was sired by multiple stakes winner Little Beans and out of the mare Nellie Mowlee. She was bred by Marian W. O'Connor at Alan Clarke's Huntington Farm near Clarksville, Maryland.

Racing career
Trained by future U.S. Racing Hall of Fame inductee Carl Hanford, his brother Ira Hanford would be La Corredora's regular jockey.

As a two-year-old, La Corredora's most important win came in the 1951 Pimlico Breeders' Stakes for trainer Alan Clark. 1952 saw Carl Hanford responsible for the three-year-old's race conditioning and she won the July 30 Monmouth Oaks by a nose in a highly competitive field that produced a blanket finish. On November 11, 1952, La Corredora won the inaugural running of the Gallorette Handicap at Pimlico Race Course.

New York Championship Year
Through September 1953, the four-year-old La Corredora had won only two non-stakes races. However, in the September 19 Beldame Handicap at Aqueduct Racetrack she showed signs she might be getting back to top form. In spite of traffic problems on the first turn and then being forced wide as she turned for home, La Corredora finished a strong third in the Beldame to the Darby Dan Farm winner Atalanta. On October 7 she won America's oldest stakes race for fillies and mares, the Ladies Handicap at Belmont Park. She then followed up with another win on November 3 in the first division of the Comely Handicap, run that year at the Jamaica Race Course. In a field of eleven, La Corredora beat Canadiana who finished in front of third-place finisher Arab Actress.

At age four, La Corredora had limited racing success.

As a broodmare
La Corredora had very little success at stud even though she was bred to some of the most distinguished names in Thoroughbred racing including Hall of Fame inductees Count Fleet, the 1943 U.S. Triple Crown winner, and Native Dancer.

Pedigree

References

1949 racehorse births
Thoroughbred family 12-b
Racehorses bred in Maryland
Racehorses trained in the United States